Moonmadness is the fourth studio album by English progressive rock band Camel. It was released in March 1976 on Decca and Gama Records and is their last album recorded by the group's original line-up of Andrew Latimer, Peter Bardens, Doug Ferguson, and Andy Ward. After reaching success with their previous album, the all instrumental The Snow Goose, the band started on a follow-up and incorporated vocals and lyrics to the new music. Moonmadness has a loose concept with one track based on the personality of each band member: "Air Born" for Andrew Latimer, "Chord Change" for Peter Bardens, "Another Night" for Doug Ferguson, and "Lunar Sea" for Andy Ward. In 2018, 42 years after its release, Camel performed the album live in its entirety.

Background
Camel's popularity grew in 1975 with their critically acclaimed instrumental album The Snow Goose, which was followed by the group voted Britain's Brightest Hope by readers of the nationwide music publication Melody Maker. In late 1975, the band spent three weeks writing new music for a follow-up album, and recorded Moonmadness in January and February 1976. At the time of release, Latimer said he was very pleased with the album despite the need to rush to finish it.

The last track, "Lunar Sea", ends with a minute-long wind-blowing effect. On some LP pressings, the record arm would skip during the end of this part and naturally return to the beginning of the effect, playing it endlessly (the "terminal groove" effect).

In the Q & Mojo Classic Special Edition Pink Floyd & The Story of Prog Rock, the album came number 23 in its list of "40 Cosmic Rock Albums".

It was voted no. 58 in the Top 100 Prog albums of All Time by readers of 'Prog' magazine in 2014.

Camel performed the album in its entirety on a 2018 tour.

Track listing

Personnel
Camel
 Andrew Latimer – guitars, flute; vocals (5, 6)
 Peter Bardens – keyboards; vocals (4)
 Doug Ferguson – bass; vocals (2)
 Andy Ward – drums, percussion; voice (1)

Production
 Engineered by Rhett Davies
 Original LP cover design by Field

Release details
 1976, UK, Gama Records/Decca Records TXS-R 115, Release Date March 1976, LP
 2002, UK, London 8829292, Release Date 3 June 2002, CD (remastered edition)

Charts

Certifications

References

External links 
 Camel - Moonmadness (1976) album review by Daevid Jehnzen, credits & releases at AllMusic.com
 Camel - Moonmadness (1976) album releases & credits at Discogs.com
 Camel - Moonmadness (1976) album review by Matthijs van der Lee, credits & user reviews at SputnikMusic.com
 Camel - Moonmadness (1976) album to be listened as stream at Play.Spotify.com

1976 albums
Camel (band) albums
Concept albums
Decca Records albums
Albums produced by Rhett Davies